Antony Eastman (26 August 1946 – 3 July 2021) was an Indian film director. He directed six films, Ambada Njaane! being his most noteworthy film. He was also credited with bringing Silk Smitha to the Malayalam film industry.

Early life 
Antony was born as the son of Muringatheri Kuriakose and Martha on 26 August 1946 in Chowannur, Kingdom of Cochin, British India. He completed his school education from Chowannur St Thomas School and Kunnamkulam Government High School. He started his career as a photographer in mid - 1960s. He started a studio, Eastman, in Ernakulam and soon, he came to be known as Antony Eastman.

Personal life 
He was married to Mary and the couple have a son and a daughter Ganji and Mini.

Career 
His directorial debut film was Inaye Thedi (1979) which was also debut work for Silk Smitha, Johnson Master, Kaloor Dennis and John Paul. He had also directed another five films Mridula, Ice Cream, Vayal, Varnatheru and Ambada Njaane. He had worked as a stills photographer for 13 films, as production executive in one film, wrote stories for nine films, wrote script for one film, produced a film, and acted in a film.

Filmography

Director
Inaye Thedi (1981) (directorial debut)
Vayal (1981)
Ambada Njaane! (1985)
Ice Cream (1986)
Mridula (1990)
Varnatheru (1999)

Death 
Antony died at the age of 74 on 3 July 2021 following a cardiac arrest.

References

External links
 

1946 births
2021 deaths
Malayalam film directors
20th-century Indian film directors
Malayalam screenwriters
20th-century Indian dramatists and playwrights
21st-century Indian dramatists and playwrights